Fábio Miguel Jesus Carvalho (born 21 December 1994), known as Fabinho, is a Portuguese professional footballer who plays for Leixões S.C. as an attacking midfielder.

Club career
Born in Nogueira da Regedoura, Santa Maria da Feira, Fabinho joined local club C.D. Feirense's youth system at the age of 10. He spent his first three seasons as a senior in the Segunda Liga, notably scoring ten goals in 41 matches in 2014–15 to help the team to the seventh position, notably from penalties.

Fabinho started in 29 of his 34 league appearances in the following campaign (two goals), as the side returned to the Primeira Liga after a four-year absence. He made his debut in the competition on 15 August 2016, featuring 77 minutes in a 2–0 away win against G.D. Estoril Praia.

International career
Fabinho was part of the Portugal under-20 team at the 2014 Toulon Tournament.

References

External links

Portuguese League profile 

1994 births
Living people
Sportspeople from Santa Maria da Feira
Portuguese footballers
Association football midfielders
Primeira Liga players
Liga Portugal 2 players
C.D. Feirense players
F.C. Famalicão players
U.D. Oliveirense players
Associação Académica de Coimbra – O.A.F. players
Leixões S.C. players
Portugal youth international footballers